Judith "Judi" Roland (born 1943) is a former American politician who served as a member of the Washington House of Representatives from 1991 to 1995.  She represented Washington's 31st legislative district as a Democrat.  She also served on the Auburn City Council.

References

1943 births
Living people
Democratic Party members of the Washington House of Representatives
Women state legislators in Washington (state)